The Pomona Valley is located in the Greater Los Angeles Area between the San Gabriel Valley and San Bernardino Valley in Southern California.

History 
On March 1, 1893 the California Assembly voted 54–14 for a new county to form in the region, to be named San Antonio County, with Pomona as its seat. Los Angeles interests in the Senate rejected the concept, however, and today the eastern and western portions of the valley remain divided between San Bernardino and Los Angeles counties (San Antonio Creek).

Geography 
The alluvial valley is formed by the Santa Ana River and its tributaries. The Pomona Valley is separated from San Gabriel Valley to the west by the northeastern end of the San Jose Hills, running approximately along State Route 57. The eastern boundaries are the Jurupa Hills and the Cajon Pass, (the eastern end of the San Gabriel Mountains) running near Interstate 15, which separates the Pomona Valley from the San Bernardino Valley. The northern boundary is the San Gabriel Mountains. The Chino Hills are the southern boundary that separates the Pomona Valley from northern Orange County. Historic U.S. Route 66 runs east-west across the north side of Pomona Valley. San Antonio Creek runs right through the center of the valley dividing the valley into west and east, and also acts as a section of the border between Los Angeles County and San Bernardino County. It originates from the San Gabriel Mountains watershed around Mount San Antonio (known locally as Mt. Baldy) and joins the Santa Ana River south of Chino. The Pomona Valley ranges from the city of San Dimas from the far west to Rancho Cucamonga to the far east portion of the valley.

Climate
The Pomona Valley experiences a Mediterranean Climate. In contrast to much of the Greater Los Angeles Area, The Pomona Valley can get much hotter summers with high temperatures ranging from the triple digits. Due to its elevation ranging from 800 to 2200 feet, winters in the Pomona Valley can also get cold. Trace amounts of snowfall can occur anywhere above 1500 feet. On the valley floor, average rainfall amounts range anywhere from 12 to 16 inches. Foothill communities can get anywhere from 14 to 18 inches of rain a year. In the fall (fire season), Santa Ana Winds can occur giving strong offshore winds from the Cajon Pass.

Demographics
The residents of the Pomona Valley are predominantly Latino and White.  In contrast to the San Gabriel Valley, the population of Asian Americans is much smaller. Northern areas of the valley that contain the cities of Claremont, La Verne, Upland, and San Dimas have large Caucasian populations. Central portions of the valley that contain the cities of Pomona, Montclair, and Ontario have large Hispanic populations. Southern portions of the Pomona Valley such as Chino Hills, Diamond Bar, and Walnut contain rather large Asian populations.

Points of interest
 American Museum of Ceramic Art, Pomona
 Fairplex, annual Los Angeles County Fair - Pomona
 California State Polytechnic University, Pomona - Pomona
 University of La Verne - La Verne
 Montclair Plaza - Montclair
 Pomona Valley Air Fair - Upland
 Pomona Valley Art Association - Gallery SOHO (located in the Pomona Arts Colony, Pomona)
 The Shoppes at Chino Hills - Chino Hills
 Raging Waters, water park - San Dimas
 Rancho Santa Ana Botanic Garden - Claremont
 Claremont Village - Claremont
 Claremont Colleges - Claremont
 Mt. San Antonio College - Walnut
 Ygnacio Palomares Adobe, List of Registered Historic Places in Los Angeles County, California - Pomona
 La Casa Primera de Rancho San Jose, List of Registered Historic Places in Los Angeles County, California - Pomona
 Victoria Gardens - Rancho Cucamonga
 Ontario Mills - Ontario

Communities

Los Angeles County 
Claremont
Diamond Bar
La Verne
Pomona
San Dimas
Walnut
San Bernardino County 
Chino
Chino Hills
Montclair
Ontario
Rancho Cucamonga
San Antonio Heights
Upland

Institutions of higher learning

 California State Polytechnic University, Pomona (Cal Poly Pomona), public - Pomona
 Chaffey College, community college - Rancho Cucamonga
 Citrus College, community college - Glendora
 Claremont Colleges, liberal arts and engineering - Claremont
 Pomona College
 Claremont Graduate University
 Scripps College
 Claremont McKenna College
 Harvey Mudd College
 Pitzer College
 Keck Graduate Institute
 Claremont School of Theology
 DeVry University, technical institute - Pomona
 Mt. San Antonio College, community college - Walnut
 University of La Verne, private - La Verne
 Western University of Health Sciences, private - Pomona

Transportation

International Airports
Ontario International Airport
Los Angeles International Airport

Public transit
Foothill Transit
Omnitrans
Public transportation in Los Angeles County, California
Public transportation in San Bernardino County, California

Highways
The Pomona Valley is served by several freeways: 
San Bernardino Freeway (Interstate 10) - connects to San Bernardino and Los Angeles
Foothill Freeway (Interstate and State Route 210) - connects to Pasadena and San Bernardino 
Ontario Freeway (Interstate 15) - connects to Las Vegas, Nevada and San Diego
Pomona Freeway (State Route 60) - connects to Riverside and Los Angeles
Chino Valley Freeway (State Route 71)
Orange Freeway (State Route 57) - connects to Anaheim

Major surface thoroughfares
Central Ave. (Chino, Montclair, Upland)
Mountain Ave. (Upland, Ontario, Chino)
Euclid Ave.  (Ontario, Upland, Chino)
Archibald Ave. (Rancho Cucamonga, Ontario)
Chino Hills Pkwy. (Diamond Bar, Chino Hills, Chino)
Haven Ave. (Rancho Cucamonga, Ontario)
Milliken Ave. (Rancho Cucamonga, Ontario)
Monte Vista Ave. (Claremont, Upland, Montclair, Chino)
Foothill Blvd. (San Dimas, La Verne, Claremont, Upland, Rancho Cucamonga, Pomona)
Bonita Ave. (San Dimas, La Verne, Pomona, Claremont)
Base Line Rd. (San Dimas, La Verne, Claremont, Rancho Cucamonga; becomes 16th St. through Upland)
Indian Hill Blvd. (Claremont, Pomona)
Grand Ave.  (Chino Hills, Diamond Bar, Walnut) 
Towne Ave. (Claremont, Pomona)
Garey Ave.  (Chino Hills, Pomona, Claremont) 
Arrow Hwy. (San Dimas, La Verne, Pomona, Claremont, Montclair)
Arrow Rte. (Upland, Rancho Cucamonga)Holt Ave. (Pomona, Montclair, Ontario; becomes Valley Blvd from Pomona to Los Angeles; Eastern end merges with the 10 Fwy)Valley Blvd. (Walnut, Pomona)Holt Blvd. (Pomona, Montclair, Ontario)Mission Blvd. (Pomona, Montclair, Ontario)Mount Baldy Road  (Claremont, San Antonio Heights, Mount Baldy, and Mt. San Antonio)In Claremont, Mt. Baldy Road leads into the Mt. Baldy Ski Lifts of Mount San Antonio in the San Gabriel Mountains.

Media

 Claremont Courier Inland Valley Daily Bulletin, with its offices located in Rancho Cucamonga
 San Gabriel Valley Tribune'', serves western Pomona Valley

See also

 Inland Empire
 San Gabriel Valley

References

External links
 The Historical Society of Pomona Valley
 Pomona Valley Art Association

 
Valleys of Los Angeles County, California
Valleys of San Bernardino County, California
Los Angeles County, California regions
Inland Empire
Geography of the San Gabriel Valley
Pomona, California
Valleys of California